Pahnay Behi (also Romanized as Pahnāy Behī; also known as Pahnābehī and Pahneh Behī) is a village in Dezhkord Rural District, Sedeh District, Eqlid County, Fars Province, Iran. At the 2006 census, its population was 297, in 61 families.

References 

Populated places in Eqlid County